Synaphea macrophylla is a shrub endemic to Western Australia.

The decumbent shrub typically blooms in October producing yellow flowers.

It is found in a small area in the South West region of Western Australia between Augusta and Margaret River where it grows in loamy-gravelly soils.

References

Eudicots of Western Australia
macrophylla
Endemic flora of Western Australia
Plants described in 1995